Cham-e Alishah (also Romanized as Cham-e ‘Alīshāh and Cham-e ‘Alī Shāh) is a village in Cham Kuh Rural District, Bagh-e Bahadoran District, Lenjan County, Isfahan Province, Iran. At the 2006 census, its population was 554, in 133 families.

References 

Populated places in Lenjan County